The Discourse of Lama《喇嘛说》is an article written by the Qianlong Emperor in the 57th year of the Qianlong era of the Qing dynasty (1792) to elaborate on the policy (Article One of The 29-Article Ordinance for the More Effective Governing of Tibet) of using lot-drawing process with Golden Urn to pick reincarnated lamas including the Dalai Lama and Panchen Lama. He explained why he thought it would be a fair system of choosing them, as opposed to choosing reincarnated lamas based on private designation, or based on one person's decision. Also, it's to eliminate greedy family with multiple reincarnated rinpoches, lamas.

The article was engraved on the stone tablet in the Lama Temple in Beijing. The height of the stone tablet is 598 cm.

References

1792 in China
Tibet
Dalai Lamas
Panchen Lamas